Gheorghe Sarău (born 21 April 1956, Segarcea-Vale, Teleorman County, Romania) is a Romanian linguist specialized in the Romani language. He is the author of several Romani textbooks and plays an important role in the process of standardization of the Romani language.

He studied at the Faculty of Foreign Languages and Literatures, University of Bucharest, Russian-Hungarian section, from where he graduated in 1983. During his student years, he also studied Bulgarian, Spanish, German, English and French. While at the faculty, he came across a book on Romani people by Jean Vaillant, which also contained a short introduction to the Romani language. He started to study the language and learn it by himself. Sarău published a large number of articles and papers on the Romani language and participated at numerous national and international conferences on the language.

See also
 Romani language
 Romani language standardization

References
  Gheorghe Sarău, an Alexandru Graur of the Romani people
  Gheorghe Sarău - Bibliografie şi activitate (Gheorghe Sarău - Bibliography and activity), Bucharest 2009,

External links
  Gheorghe Sarău's blog 
  Interview with Gheorghe Sarău
 A collection of songs sung by Gheorghe Sarău in Romani

1956 births
Living people
People from Teleorman County
Linguists from Romania
Linguists of Romani